Plinthograptis seladonia is a species of moth of the family Tortricidae. It is found in Nigeria.

The length of the forewings is about 5 mm. The ground colour of the forewings is dark grey with a bluish-green hue. The costal marking and terminal edge are orange-yellow. There is a red pattern with a brown admixture. The hindwings are brownish.

References

Endemic fauna of Nigeria
Moths described in 1981
Tortricini
Moths of Africa
Taxa named by Józef Razowski